Rimae Sirsalis is a lunar rille. It was formed by extension of the surface, possibly due to dike propagation in the subsurface.

Rimae Sirsalis cuts across highlands almost exclusively. It starts at the edge of Oceanus Procellarum near the modest crater Sirsalis from which it gets its name and proceeds directly away from the mare, eventually ending up among the cracks in the floor of the crater Darwin. Along the way it passes through craters, ranges of hills, and other small rilles.

References

Sirsalis, Rimae
Volcanic landforms